Hertur Roland Ingemar Odlander,  (29 February 1936 – 19 July 2014) was a Swedish journalist who worked for SVT news on its news programmes Aktuellt and Rapport. Between 1975 and 1978 Odlander was the first ever Swedish foreign news reporter stationed in Nairobi. From 1978 and until his death in 2014 Odlander was married to Christina Jutterström.

References

1936 births
2014 deaths
Swedish journalists